Harry Watling (born 28 November 1989) is an English football coach who is currently first team coach at Scottish Premiership side Rangers.

Coaching career
Watling earned his UEFA B licence at age 18 and his UEFA A licence at 26, which at the time made him one of the youngest coaches in England to have such a coaching licence.

Watling went on to work as an academy coach with Chelsea from 2009 to 2014, Millwall from 2014 to 2018, and West Ham United from 2018, before becoming head coach of USL Championship side Hartford Athletic on 13 January 2021.

After joining Hartford Athletic on 13 January 2021, he won his first match in charge 3–2 against New York Red Bulls II  on 30 April 2021. On 6 June 2021 in his fourth match he broke the club record for the biggest ever win in their history when he beat New York Red Bulls II 7–0 at home who had seven MLS contracted players from the first team in the lineup. On 13 June 2021 he suffered his first loss in charge of Hartford Athletic in a 3–2 loss away to Charlotte Independence. On 25 June 2022, Watling resigned from his role as Hartford coach to attend family matters back home in England.

On 25 July 2022, Watling was appointed first team coach at Championship side Queens Park Rangers. On 28 November 2022, Watling joined Michael Beale in moving to Rangers.

Personal life
Watling is married to professional footballer and Northern Ireland national team player Ciara Watling who currently plays for Southampton of the FA Women's Championship.

Managerial statistics

References 

Living people
Hartford Athletic coaches
English expatriate sportspeople in the United States
English football managers
1989 births
USL Championship coaches
Chelsea F.C. non-playing staff
Millwall F.C. non-playing staff
West Ham United F.C. non-playing staff
Sportspeople from London
English expatriate football managers
Expatriate soccer managers in the United States
Rangers F.C. non-playing staff